The Ice Age Trail is a National Scenic Trail stretching  in the state of Wisconsin in the United States. The trail is administered by the National Park Service, and is constructed and maintained by private and public agencies including the Ice Age Trail Alliance, a non-profit and member-volunteer based organization with local chapters.

Route
The trail roughly follows the location of the terminal moraine from the last Ice Age.  As the route traverses the moraine, it sometimes meanders into areas west of the moraine, including the Driftless Area in southwestern Wisconsin. The trail passes through 30 of Wisconsin's 72 counties, from the northwestern part of the state to the Lake Michigan shoreline in the east. The western end of the trail is at Interstate State Park along the St. Croix River, which is the border between northwestern Wisconsin and eastern Minnesota. The eastern terminus of the Ice Age Trail lies at Potawatomi State Park, on Wisconsin's Door Peninsula near the city of Sturgeon Bay.

Along its route, the trail crosses numerous ciry and county parks, state parks and forests, state wildlife and natural areas, and the Chequamegon-Nicolet National Forest. The trail often coincides with other trails within various county and municipal parks. It passes through the land of various owners, including the Wisconsin Department of Natural Resources, the Ice Age Trail Alliance, and hundreds of private citizens.

At one point, the trail separates into two just north of Devil's Lake State Park. The western portion of trail,  in length, is referred to as the Western Bifurcation. The Western Bifurcation consists mostly of proposed trail sections (though several miles of established trail do exist). The Western Bifurcation is rejoined by its 75-mile eastern counterpart near the town of Coloma. Though the eastern portion of the trail is more readily developed than its western counterpart, both are officially recognized portions of the Ice Age Trail. As of October 2020,  is completed with over  connected by connecting routes (usually roads).

The Ice Age Trail has one of a few National Side Trails, the Timms Hill National Trail. National Side Trails are national trails established by the National Trails System Act. The ten-mile Timms Hill Trail connects the Ice Age Trail with Timms Hill, Wisconsin's highest point, which is located in Price County.

History
The Ice Age Trail began as conservationist Ray Zillmer's idea for having an "Ice Age National Park" of 500 miles starting at St. Croix Falls, going south through Madison, northeast through the Kettle Moraine areas ending near Sturgeon Bay. The park would travel through the terminal moraine of the most recent glacier to push through Wisconsin about 10,000 years ago. He envisioned that the park would protect features like kames, drumlins, and kettle moraines. In 1958, Zillmer founded the Ice Age Park & Trail Foundation (now the Ice Age Trail Alliance (IATA)). In a 1959 interview in Wisconsin Alumnus magazine, he was quoted "This land must be purchased soon, before the population explosion following the opening of the St. Lawrence waterways affects Wisconsin, before the hills are pre-empted by private homes and the land becomes too expensive." Zillmer died in December 1959 and the National Park Service decided in 1961 that a long park was not feasible. In 1964, Wisconsin congressman Henry S. Reuss sponsored the Ice Age National Scientific Reserve bill; the bill was signed to establish nine units which he hoped would be connected by a trail (six were utilized). In 1968, Wisconsin U.S. Senator Gaylord Nelson co-sponsored the National Trails System Act which established the Appalachian Trail and Pacific Crest Trail.  During the summer of 1974, Reuss’ Legislative Assistant James H. Rathlesberger led a team of three Reuss staff routing the trail across Wisconsin.   

It was established by Act of Congress in 1980, in large part as a result of the efforts of Reuss, who in 1976 authored the book On the Trail of the Ice Age. The first person to backpack the entire length of the Ice Age Trail was 20-year-old James J. Staudacher of Shorewood, Wisconsin during the summer of 1979. He started at Potawatomi State Park in May 1979. Staudacher received maps with the proposed route and supply packages from Reuss and completed the walk at St. Croix Falls in August. Portions of the trail used existing trails in the northern unit of Kettle Moraine State Forest.

Use
The trail is open primarily to hiking, although other activities are allowed where the trail follows other existing routes. The trail received an estimated annual usage of 2.3 million people from a 2019 survey. The trail is divided into just over one hundred segments.  These segments range in length between about one and 16 miles.  Though segmented, in many places along the way, coming out of the woods at the end of one segment simply means crossing the road and re-entering the woods alongside the sign welcoming you to the next.

There are numerous opportunities for longer-distance treks, with camping opportunities including shelters in both units of the Kettle Moraine State Forest. More recently, the Trail Alliance has developed several Distributed Camping Areas spaced as to encourage more backpacking treks--22 such areas exist today (as of January 2023).  On the northwestern third of the trail, tent camping is allowed in some areas (particularily in Lincoln and Langlade Counties) provided you place your tent at least 200 feet from the trail.

As of 2020, there are 19 local IATA chapters which are trying to turn connecting routes into permanent segments. The chapters' biggest obstacle is acquiring land from private owners and permanently protecting it. Several trail chapters offer awards for completing hikes of all segments within their jurisdiction, and the Alliance also has a "cold cache" program to encourage hikers to seek out glacial features along the trail using GPS receivers.

One study of trail users found that those who stay overnight are more likely to camp than use other forms of lodging.

Sights along the trail
Primary attractions include topography left by glaciation in the Last Ice Age. Glacial features along the trail include kettles (usually as a kettle lake), potholes, eskers, kames, and glacial erratics. Many of the best examples of glacial features in Wisconsin are exhibited in units of the Ice Age National Scientific Reserve, most of which lie along the trail.

Numerous species of mammals can be seen along the trail, including red fox, American red squirrel, white-tailed deer, porcupine, black bear and grey wolf. Birds seen along the southern part of the trail include the Acadian flycatcher, Henslow's sparrow, red-headed woodpecker or hooded warbler, while further north white-throated sparrows, ruffed grouse and bald eagles become more common.

Gallery

See also
Geological Features of Wisconsin
List of hiking trails in Wisconsin
Thomas Chrowder Chamberlin, Geology of Wisconsin (1877)
Ahnapee State Trail, which coincides with the Ice Age Trail in the north

Stages
Quaternary glaciation
Illinoian Stage
Laurentide Ice Sheet
Pleistocene
Last glacial period
Driftless Area
Components
Interglacial (longer warm period during ice age, such as today)
Interstadial (brief warm period during ice age, weaker than interglacial)
Stadial (brief cooler period during interglacial, such as Older Dryas, Younger Dryas, Little Ice Age)
 Little ice age
 Post-glacial rebound
 Timeline of glaciation
Canadian Shield
Glacial history of Minnesota
Lake Agassiz
Wisconsin glaciation

References

Further reading
 Ice Age Trail Alliance. Ice Age Trail Atlas.
 Ice Age Trail Alliance. Ice Age Trail Companion Guide 2011.
Mittlefehldt, Sarah. "The origins of Wisconsin's Ice Age Trail: Ray Zillner's path to protect the past," Wisconsin Magazine of History, vol. 90, no. 3 (Spring 2007)
Reuss, Henry S., Tanner, Gilbert, Dinsmore, Philip, Hellman, Robert, with The Milwaukee Public Museum, On the Trail of the Ice Age: a hiker’s and biker’s guide to Wisconsin’s Ice Age National Scientific Reserve and Trail (January 1976)

External links

Ice Age Trail Alliance website
Ice Age National Scenic Trail, National Park Service website
Wisconsin DNR
Hiking Journals and Photos from the Ice Age Trail
Ice Age Trail Design Video produced by Wisconsin Public Television

1980 establishments in Wisconsin
Backpacking
Hiking
Hiking trails in Wisconsin
Long-distance trails in the United States
National Scenic Trails of the United States
Orienteering
Outdoor recreation
Protected areas established in 1980
Walking